Several vessels of the British Royal Navy have borne the name HMS Minorca, for the island of Menorca, which the British called "Minorca":

  was a lighter launched at Deptford in 1740 that the French captured in 1756.
  was a xebec-rigged vessel that the Royal Navy had built at Port Mahon, Minorca in 1779. She participated in one major engagement in 1780. The Navy scuttled her in 1781. 
  was a Cruizer-class brig-sloop. She served during the Napoleonic Wars in the Mediterranean and was sold in 1814 after an uneventful career.

Royal Navy ship names